Prettyboy Reservoir is a  reservoir in northern Baltimore County, Maryland, also known as the Hereford Zone. Even though the reservoir is in the county, the City of Baltimore owns the reservoir and the surrounding land of forested watershed. The reservoir is one of three reservoirs created to supply the Metropolitan Baltimore municipal water system for Baltimore City, Baltimore County and northern Anne Arundel County constructed by the Baltimore City Department of Public Works. Prettyboy Reservoir, along with Loch Raven Reservoir that is downstream of the Gunpowder Falls, provide about 61% of the drinking water for the Baltimore Metropolitan system. For this reason, the Prettyboy is considered a "source water" or drinking water watershed.
A website for the reservoir is maintained by The City of Baltimore and can be found at PrettyBoyReservoir.org
The water from Prettyboy Reservoir is transferred to Loch Raven Reservoir via Gunpowder Falls rather than directly to Baltimore. It is then transferred via tunnel from Loch Raven to the Montebello Filtration Plants in Baltimore for treatment and distribution. Prettyboy Dam, completed in 1932, impounds the Gunpowder Falls to create the Reservoir.

Prettyboy Reservoir sits behind Prettyboy Dam on the Gunpowder River, which flows into the northwestern Chesapeake Bay. Parts of the Gunpowder River, along with those of its smaller, neighboring Chesapeake Bay tributary, the Little Gunpowder River, also serve as a State Park. The reservoir area serves as land for hiking, mountain biking, road cycling, fishing, and boating. Hunting is also permitted, though hunting is limited to archery with a special permit. Swimming is prohibited. Sport bike riders and sports car enthusiasts also use the roads in the parklands that surround the reservoir.

Kayak and tubing enthusiasts float or paddle the Lower Gunpowder Falls from the dam down to Falls Road or Masemore Road. The river between those two points contains mainly Flatwater to class II rapids but one section contains a class III when the water level is normal or higher. Heavy spring rains mean that both gates at the dam may be opened to allow excess water through. Increased water levels make for excellent kayaking because of the narrow width of Gunpowder Falls' valley.

Special Department of Public Works and occasionally Baltimore City Police Officers are now patrolling all three of the metropolitan areas' watersheds.

On June 23, 2008, Prettyboy Reservoir became the site of the first rescue performed by the Baltimore County Fire Department using a helicopter with rescuers dangling from a rope. The victim was a 30-year-old woman who had injured herself while walking her dog. The department had just been trained in the rescue two weeks prior to the incident.

According to tradition, the lake was named after a settler's horse, Pretty Boy, who drowned in a nearby creek.

References

External links
Prettyboy Watershed Alliance
Where does the water come from?
Metro Reservoir Anglers, Inc.

Protected areas of Baltimore County, Maryland
Chesapeake Bay watershed
Reservoirs in Maryland
Bodies of water of Baltimore County, Maryland